Achatinella phaeozona is a species of air-breathing tree snail, an arboreal pulmonate gastropod mollusc in the family Achatinellidae. This species is endemic to Hawaii.

References

phaeozona
Molluscs of Hawaii
Endemic fauna of Hawaii
Critically endangered fauna of the United States
Taxonomy articles created by Polbot
ESA endangered species